Betty Pfefferbaum is a psychiatrist known for her early work in mental health treatment for children after a disaster. She is the director of the Terrorism and Disaster Center in the College of Medicine at Oakland University.

Research and career
Pfefferbaum worked on clinical services and research related to survivors of the Oklahoma City bombing, 1998 United States embassy bombings in Kenya, the September 11 attacks and Hurricanes Katrina and Rita. She was Lead Investigator on multiple research projects for the National Consortium for the Study of Terrorism and Responses to Terrorism and has published a large volume of research papers related to mental health treatment post disaster or terrorism, especially dealing with children.

Education
Pfefferbaum studied at the University of California, Los Angeles, and became a general and child psychiatrist. She also completed legal training and is a member of the Oklahoma Bar Association.

Selected publications

See also
Emergency psychiatry

References

Living people
Year of birth missing (living people)
University of California, Los Angeles alumni
Oakland University faculty
American women psychiatrists
21st-century American women